O. flavescens may refer to:

 Obolcola flavescens, a geometer moth
 Oligoryzomys flavescens, a southern South American rodent
 Ommatius flavescens, a robber fly
 Onchidella flavescens, a sea slug
 Opistophthalmus flavescens, a burrowing scorpion
 Orchesella flavescens, a slender springtail
 Oria flavescens, an owlet moth
 Orthosia flavescens, an owlet moth
 Otaria flavescens, a sea lion
 Ozarba flavescens, an owlet moth